Jorge Daniel Detona (born 21 May 1986) is an Argentine footballer who is last known to have played as a forward for Olmedo.

Career

At the age of 15, Detona debuted for Club Social y Deportivo Federacion in the Argentine sixth division.

Before the 2008 season, he signed for Argentine third division side Deportivo Maipú.

Before the 2010 season, he signed for Naval in the Chilean second division  after playing for Argentine fifth division club Andes Talleres but left due to the 2010 Chile earthquake.

In 2014, Detona signed for Nacional Potosí in the Bolivian top flight after playing for Argentine fourth division team Alianza Coronel Moldes, where he made 3 league appearances and scored 0 goals.

Before the 2017 season, he signed for Olmedo in Ecuador after playing for Argentine fourth division outfit Juventud Alianza.

In 2018, Detona signed for Gualaceo in the Ecuadorian second division after almost signing for DPMM, Brunei's most successful club.

In 2020, he signed for Olmedo in the Ecuadorian top flight, where he made 8 league appearances and scored 1 goal.

References

External links
 
 

Living people
1986 births
Argentine footballers
Argentine expatriate sportspeople in Ecuador
Argentine expatriate sportspeople in Chile
Argentine expatriate sportspeople in Bolivia
Association football forwards
Primera B de Chile players
Bolivian Primera División players
Ecuadorian Serie B players
Torneo Federal A players
Juventud Alianza players
Club Atlético Colegiales (Argentina) players
Footballers from Buenos Aires
Argentine expatriate footballers
Expatriate footballers in Ecuador
Expatriate footballers in Chile
Expatriate footballers in Bolivia
Ecuadorian Serie A players
C.D. Olmedo footballers
Manta F.C. footballers
Nacional Potosí players